Richard Henry Klein (born 12 October 1958) is a British television executive who is the former controller of BBC Four. He became controller in 2008, taking over from Janice Hadlow, who became Controller of BBC Two.

Early life
He was born in Burwash Common in Sussex (now in East Sussex) to Hans Klein and Bernadine Thorne. He attended Prior Park College, a Roman Catholic independent school near Bath in Somerset.

From the University of Aberdeen he gained an MA in English in 1983, and from City University London, he gained a Diploma of Journalism in 1985.

Career
He was a director on Weekend World on LWT from 1987 to 1990.

BBC
He joined the BBC in 1996 as a current affairs producer director, having worked as a freelancer for some years before. From 2005 to 2007 he was a commissioning editor for documentaries; most output of BBC Four comprises documentaries. He was succeeded by Charlotte Moore. From 2007 to 2008, he was Head of Independent Commissioning for Factual TV, of the BBC.

He became Controller of BBC Four in December 2008. In November 2009, his salary was revealed by the BBC to be £195,000.

ITV
Following his departure from BBC Four, he was Head of Factual commissioning for ITV and is now on the executive board of the independent production company Plimsoll Productions.

Personal life
Klein has one daughter and is divorced.

References

External links
 BBC Press Office biography

Video clips
 Meet the controller
 Future of BBC4
 Northern Film Media

1958 births
Living people
Alumni of City, University of London
Alumni of the University of Aberdeen
BBC executives
BBC Four controllers
British television executives
People educated at Prior Park College
People from Burwash